Gonolobus saraguranus is a species of plant in the family Apocynaceae. It is endemic to Ecuador.  It is threatened by habitat loss.

References

saraguranus
Endemic flora of Ecuador
Vulnerable plants
Taxonomy articles created by Polbot